The African Heritage Museum or African Heritage Centre is a museum and art gallery in Bakau, Gambia. It was formerly located in Banjul.  The Museum holds a large collection of African art and statues. The art presented in the museum is for sale, and is replaced by other local art when sold.

See also
List of museums in the Gambia

References

Art museums and galleries in the Gambia
Buildings and structures in Banjul
Bakau